Humberto Fabián Biazotti (born February 10, 1970 in Pergamino) is an Argentine former footballer who played for clubs from Argentina, Chile, Bolivia, and China. He played as a forward.

References
 Profile at BDFA 
 Profile at En una Baldosa 
 Profile at Fútbol XXI  
 

1970 births
Living people
Footballers from Buenos Aires
Argentine footballers
Argentine expatriate footballers
Argentina youth international footballers
Argentina under-20 international footballers
Estudiantes de La Plata footballers
San Martín de Tucumán footballers
Atlético Tucumán footballers
Rosario Central footballers
Ferro Carril Oeste footballers
All Boys footballers
Club Aurora players
C.D. Antofagasta footballers
Chilean Primera División players
Argentine Primera División players
Expatriate footballers in Chile
Expatriate footballers in China
Expatriate footballers in Bolivia
Association football forwards